Pamela Paul (born March 2, 1971) is an American columnist, journalist, editor, and author. Since 2022, she has been an op-ed writer for The New York Times. From 2013 to 2022, she was the editor of The New York Times Book Review, where her role expanded to oversee all New York Times book coverage including the staff critics and publishing news. At the Times, Paul has faced repeated criticism for her coverage of transgender people.

Early life and education
Paul is the daughter of Carole and Jerome D. Paul. Her father was a construction contractor and her mother was an advertising copywriter and later, the editor of Retail Ad World. She is of Jewish descent.

Career
Paul was a contributor to Time magazine and has written for many other publications, including Vogue, The Washington Post, The Atlantic, and Worth. She was a senior editor at the erstwhile magazine American Demographics, and was a London- and New York-based correspondent for The Economist, for which she wrote a monthly arts column from 1997 to 2002, and reviewed film, theater and books.

In 2011, Paul joined The New York Times and wrote the Studied column, as well as serving as children's books editor and features editor for the Book Review, before her promotion to the editorship of the Book Review. During her time as editor, she hosted the Book Reviews weekly podcast. Podsauce described it under her direction as "one of the top podcasts in the world".

She is the author of eight books. The end of her first marriage inspired her to write her first book, The Starter Marriage and the Future of Matrimony, which was featured on The Oprah Winfrey Show, The Today Show, Politically Incorrect and Good Morning America. After the 2005 publication of her book Pornified, she testified about pornography to the Senate Judiciary Committee.

In 2022, she moved from the Books section to the Opinion section at the New York Times. Her columns appear in the Times weekly, have covered many topics, and attract significant comment from Times readers, journalists in other publications, political groups, and academics. This includes remarks deemed to be hostile to transgender people. She has been praised for her writing about self-censorship in the publishing industry,  the dignity of work, and the importance of reading.

Personal life
Her first marriage, to Times columnist Bret Stephens, ended in divorce. In 2004, she married hedge fund financier Michael Stern.

Bibliography

References

External links
 
 

1970s births
20th-century American journalists
20th-century American non-fiction writers
20th-century American women writers
21st-century American journalists
21st-century American non-fiction writers
21st-century American women writers
American columnists
American expatriates in England
American people of Jewish descent
American podcasters
American women columnists
American women non-fiction writers
American women podcasters
Living people
People from Long Island
Place of birth missing (living people)
The Economist people
The New York Times editors
The New York Times writers
Time (magazine) people
Year of birth missing (living people)